Kevin Lamar Miniefield (born March 2, 1970) is a former American football cornerback in the National Football League (NFL). He was drafted by the Detroit Lions in the eight round of the 1993 NFL Draft. He played college football at Arizona State. Miniefield also played for the Chicago Bears and Arizona Cardinals.

Miniefield has four children with his wife Blake Miniefield: Kylie Miniefield, Bryce Miniefield, Kevin "KJ" Miniefield and Bailey Miniefield. Kylie Miniefield served as captain of the Arizona State University women's soccer team and graduated from the Sandra Day O'Connor College of Law and W.P. Carey School of Business. Bryce Miniefield competes on the University of Las Vegas women's soccer team. Kevin "KJ" Miniefield is a dual-sport athlete competing in both football and track and field at Desert Ridge High School. Bailey Miniefield is also a dual-sport athlete and competes as a level 10 gymnast at Gold Medal Gymnastics and cheers at Hamilton High School. 

1970 births
Living people
American football cornerbacks
Arizona State Sun Devils football players
Detroit Lions players
Chicago Bears players
Arizona Cardinals players